The Department of the Northern Territory was an Australian government department that existed between December 1972 and June 1975. It was the second so-named Australian Government department.

History
The department was one of several new Departments established by the Whitlam Government, a wide restructuring that revealed some of the new government's program. The creation of the department, with a Darwin-based Secretary, was seen by many as an effort to undermine the role of the Northern Territory Administrator.

Scope
Information about the department's functions and/or government funding allocation could be found in the Administrative Arrangements Orders, the annual Portfolio Budget Statements and in the department's annual reports.

The department was responsible for the administration of the Northern Territory of Australia and the Territory of Ashmore and Cartier Islands. The principal matters dealt with by the department at its creation were:
Urban development and town planning 
Transport planning; and
Local government, community services and housing 
Forest, fisheries, wildlife, and National Parks 
Animal industry and agriculture 
Mines 
Water resources

Structure
The department was a Commonwealth Public Service department, staffed by officials who were responsible to the Minister for the Northern Territory. When the department was established, George Warwick Smith was named Secretary. After less than a month, he was replaced by Allan O'Brien.

References

Australia, Northern Territory
Northern Territory
1972 establishments in Australia
1975 disestablishments in Australia